Rákospalotai EAC is a Hungarian football club based in the Rákospalota quarter in the north-east of Budapest.  REAC were promoted to the Nemzeti Bajnokság I., the first division in Hungarian football, after the 2005/06 season, but the team was relegated to the Hungarian National Championship II after the 2008/09 season. The football team plays its home matches at Laszló Budai II Stadium.

History

1912 to 1991: Founding to the end of Volán
A team named REAC was founded in the Budapest neighborhood Rákospalota in 1912, but operations ended in the 1940s. Football continued, however, in the neighborhood with the best known teams being Fősped Szállítók and Volán, the latter of which entered the NB I. in 1979. Until 1991, when the club came to an end, Volán had enjoyed six seasons in the top flight, although they never finished higher than 11th and often finished at the very bottom of the table. What remained of the club merged with RAK and on August 8 resurrected the name REAC. Since Volán officially ended prior to the merger the newly reformed REAC didn't take any of its records, nor was it allowed to continue in the NB I. Instead they began play in the BLSZ I.

1992: The fight for the second division
By 1992 they had dropped to the NB III Mátra group, and though the goal was clearly to return to the second division they had a tough path to work through, including Monor and former NB I. team Szolnok MÁV. As winter came and the first half of the season came to a close, REAC was in third place, but only a point separated them and Dunakeszi VSE for second. They would finish that spring not only with 41 points, exactly one point ahead of second place Gyöngyös, but with the right to play in the NB II. that coming fall.

1993: The first year in NB II
The team was placed in the Eastern division of NB II., which was clearly the more difficult at the time—former NB I. teams Diósgyőr and Nyíregyháza Spartacus were also in the division, as well as several other strong clubs. The team, however, knew it would be more important to defeat the weaker teams in the division—Eger, Szeged, for instance—if it was even going to think about competing with the better teams. Under the guidance of their coach and former Fradi player and József Dálnoki, they won their first match 1–0 against Gödöllő. The good start was short-lived, however, and over the next five matches they would only gain one point in the standings. A 3–0 win over Eger brought hope, but over the next eight matches they didn't notch a single win and only three ties. The team fired Dálnoki, and hired former Hungarian national team player Imre Garaba, who would have to wait five matches before the team's next victory. They ended the season in last place, and prepared to return to NB III.

1994–1995: Back in NB III
Relegation hurt the team as many players left (several eventually ended up in NB I) as did Garaba, who left for Gödöllő. He was replaced by Péter Antal, a former Vasas player. They began the 1994–1995 season with two scoreless losses and by the halfway point of the season they were in sixth place. But the team didn't give up hope, winning ten and drawing twice in their next 12 matches and with three matches left the team was in second place. Though they won one against Eger, the team ultimately ended the season in 3rd place.

The team started the 1995–1996 optimistic and with a stronger team than most of the competition. Aside from a surprise home loss against Selypi Kinizsi the team did just that and they ended the first half of the season tied for first with Szolnok MÁV. In a decisive match in the second half of the season, REAC lost to Szolnok and ultimately lost the championship, though they led the league in goals scored with 66.

1996–1998: Return to the second division
REAC came back for their third season in the NB III Mátra group with a new coach; the former Volán defender Béla Hegedűs. Though they began the season with four wins, two losses followed, and Hegedűs stepped down, being replaced by László Kiss. Though they played strong throughout the season, they ended the season in 2nd place.

In 1997 the league restructured, and though REAC finished second, they began the 1997–1998 season in the NB II Eastern Group. Their goal was clear from that point; remaining in the second division. Though the club struggled, they finished the year in 8th place and prepared for their second straight season in the NB II.

The team had high hopes coming into 1998. Former coach Kiss returned to the team along with most of the team's key players. Though they started out strong, they completely fell apart and by the season's halfway point they found themselves in 10th place. Their woes continued in the second half of the season, where they only gained four points in the next seven matches. They were able to end things on a winning note, though they still finished the season in tenth place.

2005–present: NB I and relegation
2005–2006, the team's first season in the top division was full of hardship, and the team finished in 14th place, just barely outside of the relegation zone. The story was similar in 2006–2007, with only one match left in the season they were among three teams statistically in danger of relegation. They finished the season with a 2–2 draw against Fehérvár, but since Pécs were unable to beat Vác REAC were safe from relegation once again and were allowed to compete in the NB I. for a third straight season. This was made official on May 24, 2007, when the team was among five Hungarian clubs who had their professional licenses renewed by MLSZ. In the 2008/09 season the team could not escape relegation, and went down to the second division for the next season. In 2012, the team was relegated to the third division, NBIII. In 2017, the team was relegated to the fourth division, that is, the Budapest first division championship.

Suicide of chairman Róbert Kutasi

It was reported on 2 March 2012 that the chairman of the club, Róbert Kutasi, had committed suicide at the age of 48

Results (1991–present)

Squad in 2011 
''As of 6 September 2011

 (c)

Honours
 Hungarian League
 NB II. Keleti Group champions (1): 2005
 NB III. Mátra Group champions (1): 1993

References

External links
 Official site
 Matches, old-tickets, ground photos at magyarfutball.hu

 
Football clubs in Hungary
1912 establishments in Hungary